Watford Grammar School for Boys (commonly abbreviated as WBGS) is a partially selective academy for boys in Watford in Hertfordshire, England.
The school and its sister school, Watford Grammar School for Girls, descend from a Free School founded as a charity school for boys and girls by Elizabeth Fuller in 1704.
Despite its name, the school accepts boys of all abilities, although approximately a third are selected for academic or musical aptitude, and brothers of existing pupils are also guaranteed places. Its results are among the highest achieved by non-grammar schools in England.

History of the Watford Grammar Schools 

In 1704, Mrs Elizabeth Fuller of Watford Place built the Watford Free School for forty boys and twenty girls on her land next to the churchyard, with rooms for a Master and a Mistress. The school-house was a fine structure at the south-west corner of St Mary's churchyard, and can still be seen there.
In 1708 Mrs Fuller endowed the school with a rent-charge of £52 a year. The boys were taught to read, write and cast accounts, and the girls to read English, to knit and to sew.

The £52 a year was augmented with bequests, producing a revenue of £178, but the rent-charges were fixed and lost their value through inflation.
Despite the help of endowments and gifts, the original charity school was in a sad state by the 1870s, when an application to the Charity Commissioners to sell part of the endowment to pay for overdue repairs led to an enquiry into the school.
In 1878, the Commission forbad the school from admitting any more pupils in its current state, and asked the trustees to choose between turning the school into a public elementary school or amalgamating with a sum of £13,333/6/8d from the Platt Foundation for Aldenham School to form a new middle class school.
With some reluctance, the trustees chose the latter, and the free school closed on 10 August 1882.
The 13 boys and 2 girls still at the school were placed in local elementary schools.

In 1881, a scheme was presented to the Charity Commissioners, combining Mrs Fuller's foundation with a portion of the Platt foundation to form the Watford Endowed Schools, which would educate up to 200 boys and 100 girls from age 7 to 16.
The fees would be £4 to £8, though there would also be a number of scholarships.
The trustees of the Free School became governors of the new schools, as did three representatives of the Brewers' Company (trustees of the Platt Foundation) and the vicar of Watford.
The schools' crest reflects the union of the two foundations:
 On the left is the coat of arms of John Chilcott (Elizabeth Fuller's father), which are inscribed over the door of the Free School.
 On the right is the coat of arms of Richard Platt, which may also be seen at Aldenham School.
The schools' motto dates from the same period, and was taken from Virgil's Aeneid IX, 158: "pugnam sperate parati" ("look forward to the battle, being prepared").

Sites were found in Derby Road for two new schools adjoining each other, one for boys and a smaller one for girls.
(These buildings are now the Central Primary School.)
The new boys' school was opened by the Earl of Clarendon on 21 April 1884, and the girls' school the next day.
They started with 69 boys and 46 girls, rising to 129 boys and 68 girls during the year.

In 1903, the schools' names were changed to the Watford Grammar School and the Watford Grammar School for Girls.
By 1904, the schools had outgrown their buildings, with 312 boys and 148 girls.
With the help of Hertfordshire County Council, a new girls' school was built and opened in Lady's Close in 1907, and the boys spread into the building the girls had vacated.
In return, the council demanded changes in the schools' denominational character, and in 1908 a revised scheme removed the requirement that masters and mistresses belong to the Church of England and allowed pupils to opt out of instruction in the teachings of the Church.
The leaving age was also raised to 17, and the number of scholarships increased.

The building was still insufficient for the boys' school, and with assistance from the County Council the school purchased part of Cassiobury Park facing Rickmansworth Road to build a new school.
On 23 February 1912, the boys assembled outside the Derby road buildings and walked to the new site, which was formally opened by the Earl of Clarendon on 20 March 1912.

Sixth Form courses were introduced during the First World War.
In 1924, Rugby union was introduced in the boys' school and took over from football as the main winter sport.

The schools had become increasingly reliant on the county council for building funds, and with the introduction of the Tripartite System in 1944, the schools fully entered the maintained sector as voluntary controlled grammar schools.

From 1947 to 1974 Hertfordshire participated in the Fleming scheme and five boys, Archie Lang (1950), Mike Farr (1952), Michael Harding and Christopher Horne (both 1958) and Richard Holman (1959) went to Eton under the scheme. Howard Fisher, and Paul Dillingham, son of the Mayor of Watford, went to Winchester under the same scheme.

The schools also phased out their preparatory or junior departments to become purely secondary schools.

With the scrapping of the Tripartite System, they became comprehensive in 1975, and continued to expand.
They became grant-maintained schools in 1990, controlled by their own governing bodies, independent of the county council, and funded directly by the Department for Education, and in 1995 introduced partial selection.
In 1999 the schools converted to voluntary aided status.

The two schools maintain matching admissions policies.
The selective proportion of their intake has been reduced since 1995, and currently stands at 25% academic and 10% musical aptitude.
Their catchment area for selective admission reaches out about 5 miles, including some northern parts of the London boroughs of Harrow and Hillingdon.
The schools also give priority to siblings of current pupils.
Prior to 2008, each of them also gave priority to siblings of pupils at the other school (Watford Grammar School for Girls).

In 2010 the school became one of the first schools rated 'outstanding' by Ofsted to become an academy, along with the girls school.

Every year there is a Founder's Day service to commemorate the charitable foundations and to celebrate Dame Elizabeth Fuller's commitment and dedication to the school. This service is carried out at St Mary's Church in  Watford Town centre.

In 2016 The Independent Newspaper Published a table listing Watford Grammar School for Boys as the 7th Best Comprehensive or Partially Selective in the United Kingdom.

School site 

The school was used as a location for many of the external and internal shots in the filming of The History Boys.

In recent years the school has built a gym, a music block (also partly owned by Hertfordshire School of Music) and a Sixth Form centre with a food technology lab, financed through fundraising and the sale of land on the northern edge of the grounds for residential development.
The school's music block, the "Clarendon Muse", stands on the front lawn of the school.
It is also used by the Hertfordshire School of Music in the evenings and weekends.

The school's new STEM Centre for the teaching of science, technology, engineering and maths was completed in November 2017 and opened by Lord Winston, before dismantled by the students, equipment was sourced from the technology block. Funding was providing by national and local government and parental donations supported the fittings and fixtures of the building.

Many sports are played at the New Field (shared with the Old Boys sports clubs) beside the Grand Union Canal near Cassiobury Park.

House System 
In the 1950s there were five houses; Bushey, North, South, Travellers and New. Fuller was added during that decade.

The most recent form to be added was Rée, introduced to years 7 and 12 in September 2018.

Each year in the school is divided into 8 forms, which belong to 8 different houses – the names of which are significant in the history of the school. Every year, the houses compete for the House Cup. They use the House Point system, and the house which has gained the most house points wins the House Cup. Each house point given equals to 2 pence given to a chosen charity. On average, each house would earn about £400 for charity. The points system works like this:

House Point     = 1 House Point

Commendation    = 3 House Points

Half Merit      = 5 House Points

Merit           = 10 House Points

Notable old Fullerians 

Old Boys of the School are known as "Old Fullerians".
In chronological order:
 Captain Alan Rice-Oxley DFC (1898–1961), RAF officer, World War One fighter ace
 Gerald Moore (1899–1987), piano accompanist
 Group Captain Leslie Bonnet (1902–1985), RAF officer, writer and originator of the Welsh Harlequin Duck
 Edgar Anstey (1907–1987), documentary film pioneer
 Douglas Noel Sargent (1907–1979), 3rd Bishop of Selsby
 Eric Robinson (1908–1974), BBC television music presenter-conductor
 Arthur Geoffrey Walker, FRS, FRSE (1909–2001), mathematician
 Air Vice-Marshal Robert Bateson DSO and Bar, DFC (1912–1986), RAF officer who led the raid on the Gestapo headquarters in The Hague
 Lieutenant-Colonel Terence Otway DSO (1914–2006), Commanding Officer of 9th Bn. Parachute Regiment, assaulted the Merville Battery on D-Day
 Peter Laslett (1915–2001), historian
 William Hurst Rees (1917–2004), leading valuation surveyor
 John David Wilson (1919–2013), artist 
 Air Vice-Marshal Colin Coulthard AFC and Bar (1921–2004), senior RAF officer and Air Attaché to Washington
 Reverend Canon Arthur Peacocke (1924–2006), theologian and evolutionist
 Richard Hughes (1926–2020), cricketer 
 Terry Scott (1927–1994), actor and comedian
 Uwe Kitzinger, CBE (* 1928), political analyst; Fellow, Nuffield College, Oxford (1956–1976); Foundation President, Templeton College, Oxford (1984—1991)
 Don Anthony, Represented Great Britain in the 1956 Summer Olympics in the Hammer Throw. Dedicated his life to the Olympic movement.
 John Clark (1932– ), actor and director
 A.D. (Tony) Nuttall (1937–2007), professor of English at Sussex and Oxford
 George Walker (* 1942), director general of the International Baccalaureate Organization
 David Crighton, FRS (1942–2000), professor of applied mathematics, Master of Jesus College, Cambridge
 John Grillo (* 1942), theatre, film and television actor and playwright
 John Orr (1943–2010), Professor Emeritus, School of Social and Political Studies, Edinburgh University
 Sir Ian Prosser (1943– ), chairman of Bass plc, later Six Continents

 Sir Andrew Davis (* 1944), orchestral conductor
 Rt Revd John Hind (* 1945), Bishop of Chichester, 2001–2012
 Knox (* 1945), musician
 Michael Rosen (* 1946), poet, writer and radio presenter, Children's Laureate
 John Taylor (1946– ), Wales and British Lions rugby player
 John K. Truss (* 1947), Professor of Pure Mathematics, University of Leeds
 Peter Taylor-Gooby, OBE, FBA (1948– ), Professor of Social Policy, University of Kent; Chair, British Academy New Paradigms in Public Policy Programme (2009–2011)
 David Sullivan (1949– ), pornographer and former director of Birmingham City FC, current co-chairman of West Ham United F.C., joined the sixth form in the 1960s.
 Oliver Knussen (1952–2018), composer and conductor
 Adrian Leaper (* 1953), orchestral conductor
 Michael Thompson (1954– ), principal horn, Philharmonia Orchestra, horn soloist, professor, Royal Academy of Music
 Nick Bunker (* 1958), author and historian.
 Michael Purton, horn soloist and principal horn (1973–86), Hallé Orchestra, record producer
 Charles C. Taylor (* 1959), Professor of Statistics, University of Leeds
 Liam Gillick (* 1964) Artist
 Simon Munnery (* 1967), comedian and comedy writer
 Steve Easterbrook (* 1967), CEO of McDonald's
 Grant Shapps (1968– ), Chairman of the Conservative Party (2012–2015), MP for Welwyn Hatfield (2005–).
 Lee "Muddy" Baker (* 1969), musician
 Martin Rossiter (1970– ), ex lead singer of 90s Brit Pop band Gene
 David Pyatt (* 1974), horn soloist, BBC Young Musician of the Year, 1988
 Josh Lewsey (* 1976), England rugby player
 Duncan Hames (* 1977), Liberal Democrats MP for Chippenham (2010–2015)
Tim Thorpe (* 1983), Principal Horn at BBC National Orchestra of Wales
James Smith (1985–), musician and lead singer of Hadouken!
 Donald Barrell (* 1986), Saracens and England sevens star
 Matthew Buckley (* 1987), actor
Chris Stark (* 1987), British radio personality
Alex Lozowski (* 1993), Rugby union player for Saracens

Notable teachers 
 Sir Stanley Rous (football referee and FIFA president) was an assistant master (sports) 1921–1934.
 Harry Rée (educationist and wartime member of the Special Operations Executive) was headmaster 1951–1962.
 George Walker (director general of the International Baccalaureate Organization) was a chemistry teacher 1966–1968.

Headmasters
(since the founding of the Watford Endowed School in 1884)
 1884–1914 William Robert Carter
 1914–1922 Harold Nicholson
 1922–1938 Edward Reynolds
 1938–1951 Percy Bolton
 1951–1962 Harry Rée
 1963–1991 Keith Turner
 1991–1993 Robert Evans
 1993–1994 Neil Hart
 1994–2000 Professor Sir John Holman
 2000–2014 Martin Post
 2014–2015 Mark Allchorn (acting)
 2015–Present Ian Cooksey

Old Fullerians' Association 
The Old Boys Association, formed in 1894, is known as the "Old Fullerians' Association". All former pupils and past and present teachers and governors of the school are eligible for membership. Serving teachers automatically become honorary members. The mission of the Association is to support the school and its students. This is currently achieved by raising funds for selected school projects and also by giving Old Boys opportunities to stay in touch with each other and with the school through events including the annual OFA Dinner, through newsletters and also through the very strong cricket and golf sports societies.

There are a number of associated clubs and societies:
Association Football Club
Cricket Club, formed in 1947
Golfing Society
Rugby Football Club

References

External links 
Watford Grammar School for Boys website
Friends of the School
Old Fullerians' Cricket Club
 Fullerians Rugby Football Club

Educational institutions established in 1704
1704 establishments in England
Schools in Watford
Academies in Hertfordshire
Boys' schools in Hertfordshire
Grade II listed buildings in Hertfordshire
Grade II listed educational buildings
Formerly selective schools in the United Kingdom
Secondary schools in Hertfordshire